Besançon-Viotte is the main railway station located in Besançon, Doubs, eastern France. The station was opened in 1855 and is located on the Dole–Belfort railway, Besançon–Le Locle railway and Besançon-Viotte-Vesoul railway. The train services are operated by SNCF. Besançon Franche-Comté TGV is a high speed station located 10km north of Besançon.

Train services
From Besançon-Viotte train services depart to major French cities such as Paris, Dijon, Strasbourg and Lyon. International services operate to Switzerland: La Chaux-de-Fonds. The station is also served by regional trains towards Montbéliard, Belfort, Dole and Lons-le-Saunier.

High speed services (TGV) Paris - Dijon - Besançon
Shuttle services (TER Bourgogne-Franche-Comté) Besançon - Besançon TGV
Regional services (TER Bourgogne-Franche-Comté) Besançon - Mouchard - Lons-le-Saunier - Bourg-en-Bresse - Lyon
Regional services (TER Bourgogne-Franche-Comté) Besançon - Montbéliard - Belfort
Regional services (TER Bourgogne-Franche-Comté) Besançon - Dole - Dijon
Regional services (TER Bourgogne-Franche-Comté) Besançon - Morteau - La Chaux-de-Fonds
Bus services (TER) Besançon - Vesoul
Bus services (TER) Besançon - Gray

References

External links

Railway stations in France opened in 1855
Railway stations in Doubs